Arthur Ashwell may refer to:

 Arthur Ashwell (Nottinghamshire cricketer) (1853–1925), English cricketer
 Arthur Ashwell (Kent cricketer) (1908–1985), English cricketer
 Arthur Rawson Ashwell (1824–1879), canon residentiary of Chichester